Running at the ring or riding at the ring or tilting at the ring was an equestrian tournament activity practiced at European royal courts.

Description

Participants rode at full speed to thrust the point of the lance through a ring or to hook a ring and carry it off. A performer was allowed three attempts. The French author and riding master Antoine de Pluvinel published descriptions and the rules. This version of a lance game or quintain could be played in teams, and the riders sometimes dressed in exotic fancy costume as a spectacle at weddings or other court festivals. There are many records of running at the ring at the Scottish and Tudor courts.

A tournament of tilting at the ring continues to be held in Denmark at Sønderborg annually in July and the Ringridermuseet is dedicated to the sport. It is also a tradition to have variations of this game at summer get-togethers in small Danish villages. Here they will often use anything but a horse, such as bike, lawnmower, tractor or even other people.

Tudor tournaments
Costume fabrics for Henry VIII of England to run at the ring at Greenwich Palace in January and February 1516 included velvets, damasks, satins, and sarcenets. He performed at Richmond Palace for the Venetian ambassador in May 1517. John Dudley, 1st Duke of Northumberland wagered and lost a valuable velvet cap to Jakes Granado, running at the ring at Westminster Palace on 6 June 1550. Jacques Granado and his brother Bernardine were Squires of the Stable to Edward VI.  In 1655 Edward Somerset, 2nd Marquess of Worcester included an artificial horse, for running at the ring, a "ring horse", in his Century of Inventions.

Scottish records
In December 1561, René, Marquis of Elbeuf, with John Stewart, Commendator of Coldingham, Robert Stewart, 1st Earl of Orkney, and others, performed in a tournament on the sands of Leith, probably to celebrate the birthday of Mary, Queen of Scots. There was running at the ring, with two teams of six men, one team dressed as women, the other as exotic foreigners in strange masquing garments. Mary offered a diamond ring as a prize to runners in March 1566.

In October 1579 James VI of Scotland took up residence at Holyroodhouse. Sand was brought to lay out a course for running at the ring, under the direction of William MacDowall who had supervised works in the palace garden for three decades. The rings were suspended from a "potence". The lances used may have been hollow and lighter than those used for combat.

Elizabeth Stewart married James Stewart, 2nd Earl of Moray in January 1581. The wedding was celebrated in Fife with a tournament of "running at the ring" and James VI took part. Two day after the party came to Leith, where a water pageant culminated with an assault on a pasteboard Papal Castel Sant'Angelo, built on boats on the water of Leith. White satin and taffeta oufits, "play claithis", were bought for James VI, his master stabler, and a page. In February 1581 a payment was made for painted spears supplied to James VI and sand delivered to Holyrood to build a course or track called a "carear" or career.

Jousting at the court of James VI was celebrated by the poet Alexander Montgomerie in A Cartell of Thrie Ventrous Knights, which seems to be a pageant prologue for an actual tournament:To prove thy knights. We dout not bot they dare,In play or ernest, be bold to brek a tre.       (tree = lance)And so I trou, dare ony of yon thrie:Bot they are not come heir for sik a thing;Bot rather, for thair Ladyes sake, to seQuha fairest runis, and oftest taks the ring.Go to than, schirs, and let us streik a sting.Cast crosse or pyle, wha sall begin the play;And let the luifsume Ladyis and the KingDecerne, as judges, wha dois best, this day.

The Earl of Leicester sent James VI a pied horse, and Roger Aston wrote to him that James rode "right bravely" for a golden ring on 10 June 1580, when six riders challenged all comers during a royal progress at Dundee. 

At the baptism of Prince Henry in August 1594 at Stirling Castle, there were three teams of riders. One team was dressed as the Christian Knights of Malta, one in Turkish fashion, and three men dressed as Amazons. A fourth team, to be dressed as Africans called "Moors" did not show up. The event was held in the valley by the castle, and watched by the queen, Anne of Denmark, with her ladies-in-waiting, and the ambassadors. The audience was swelled by a large crowd of young men from Edinburgh armed with muskets.

The "Christian Knights" were James VI; the Earl of Mar; and Thomas Erskine of Gogar. The "Turks" were the Duke of Lennox; Lord Home; and Sir Robert Kerr of Cessford. The "Amazons" were the Lord Lindores as Penthesilea; the Laird of Buccleuch; and the Abbot of Holyroodhouse. These all bore devices or imprese pertaining to the themes of the festival. Anne of Denmark gave diamond rings to the victors.

The rules of the Stirling tournament were:
 1 That all the persons of this pastime compere masked, and in such Order as they come into the Field, so to run out all their courses. 
 2 That None use any other Ring but that which is put up: and use no other Lance but that which they have brought for themselves
 3. He that twice touches the Ring, or stirs it, winneth as muche as if he carried away the ring
 4. He that lets his lance fall out of his hand is deprived of all the rest of his courses
 5. That every one run with loose reins, and with as much speed as his horse hath
 6. That none after his Race, in up-taking of his Horse, lay his Lance upon his shoulder, under the pain of losse of that which he hath done in his course
 7. He that carrieth not his Lance under his arme, loseth his course
 8. That none, until his three courses be ended, change his horse, if he be not hurt, or upon some other consideration moved to change him.Samuel Pegge, Curialia (London, 1791), pp. 37-8, from Fowler's True Reportary.

Some people were not pleased at the idea of the king and his companions dressed as the Catholic "Knights of the Holy Spirit". The intended interpretation was perhaps that the knights would be seen as Protestants overcoming "Turks" who represented the Catholic church.

Spears were bought for James VI to run at the ring and "run at the glove" at Perth in August 1601.

Carpet knights
After the Union of the Crowns, the courtier Roger Wilbraham wrote a summary of his impressions of the entertainments at court in January 1604, including the masque of The Vision of the Twelve Goddesses and ruuning at the ring; "King James was at his court at Hampton, where the French, Spanish, and Polonian ambassadors were severallie solemplie feasted, many plaies & daunces with swordes, one mask by English & Scottish lords, another by the Queen's Maiestie & eleven more ladies of her chamber presenting giftes as goddesses. These maskes, especially the laste, costes £2000 or £3000, the aparells, rare musick, fine songes, and in jewels most riche £20,000, the least to my judgment, & [jewels for] her Majestie £100,000, after Christmas was running at the ring by the King & 8 or 9 lords for the honour of those goddesses & then they all feasted together privatelie."

James VI and I competed with his brother-in-law Christian IV of Denmark at running at the ring in August 1606. Prince Henry competed at running at the ring with foreign visitors and diplomats including Louis Frederick, Duke of Württemberg-Montbéliard in April and May 1610. On Monday 15 February 1613, after the wedding of Princess Elizabeth and Frederick V of the Palatinate there was a tournament of tilting and running at the ring at Whitehall. Anne of Denmark, Elizabeth, and aristocratic women watched from the Banqueting House. King James rode first. Prince Charles did particularly well. The performances of expert riders were appreciated for taking the ring with "much strangeness".

Philip Massinger in his play The Maid of Honour wrote of "carpet knights" who "thought to charge, through dust and blood, an armed foe, Was but like graceful running at the ring". William Cavendish, 1st Duke of Newcastle built a magnificent riding school and stable at Bolsover Castle. As a young man he had frequently taken part in equestrian sports and running at the ring at the royal court.

Spanish Match
The Spanish word for running at the ring was sortija. There were tournaments including running at ring in Madrid in 1623 when Prince Charles visited in pursuit of his Spanish Match. News from Spain was brought to the English court at Theobalds by Richard Graham, Master of Horse. After his Royal Entry to Madrid, Charles and the Marquess of Buckingham were invited to view the course from a high window with Philip III of Spain and his sister. When they went down to take part themselves, Charles saw the Infanta Maria Anna of Spain for the second time, watching his run from the same window. He "took away" the ring, and was the only successful rider that day. The early biographer of James VI and I, Arthur Wilson, includes brief version the same story.

References

Court of Mary, Queen of Scots
Court of James VI and I
Jousting
Material culture of royal courts